Sylvana Lorenz (born February 14, 1953) is a French art dealer and writer in charge of communication for Pierre Cardin space since 1998.

Bibliography 

1991: L'ingénue galeriste, Editions Antoine Candau.
1993: La galeriste avertie, Z'editions, Nice.
2001: La galeriste extravertie, Z'éditions, Nice.
2003: A nous deux, Paris !, Éditions Flammarion, Paris.
2006 : Biographie de Pierre Cardin, Editions Calmann-Lévy, Paris.

References

External links 
 

1953 births
Living people